Sergei Pavlovich Berdnikov (born January 5, 1971, in Bratsk, USSR), is a Russian former ice hockey player. He played for Avangard Omsk from 1989–1994 and 1996-1998.

Career statistics

References

External links 
 

1971 births
Avangard Omsk players
Charlotte Checkers (1993–2010) players
HC Lada Togliatti players
Metallurg Novokuznetsk players
HC MVD players
Severstal Cherepovets players
HC Sibir Novosibirsk players
Living people
Lokomotiv Yaroslavl players
Providence Bruins players
Russian ice hockey coaches
Russian ice hockey left wingers
Soviet ice hockey left wingers
Portland Rage players
Sacramento River Rats players
People from Angarsk
Sportspeople from Irkutsk Oblast